West Tanjung Jabung Regency is a regency of Jambi Province, Indonesia. It is located on the island of Sumatra. The regency has an area of 5,009.82 km2 and had a population of 278,741 as at the 2010 census and 317,498 at the 2020 census. The regency seat is Kuala Tungkal.

Administrative districts
The regency is divided into thirteen districts (kecamatan), tabulated below with their areas and their populations at the 2010 census and the 2020 census. The table also includes the locations of the district administrative centres, and the number of administrative villages (rural desa and urban kelurahan) in each district.

References

External links

Official site 

Regencies of Jambi